Altagonum wegneri is a species of ground beetle in the subfamily Carabinae. It was described by Louwerens in 1956.

References

wegneri
Beetles described in 1956